Beta bulge loops are commonly occurring motifs in proteins and polypeptides consisting of five  to six amino acids. There are two types: type 1, which is a pentapeptide; and type 2, with six amino acids. They are regarded as a type of beta bulge, and have the alternative name of type G1 beta bulge. Compared to other beta bulges, beta bulge loops give rise to chain reversal such that they often occur at the loop ends of beta hairpins; hairpins of this sort can be described as 3:5 (for a type 1 β bulge loop) or 4:6 (for type 2). Two websites are available for finding and examining β bulge loops in proteins, Motivated Proteins:   and PDBeMotif: .

Type I beta bulge loops have two characteristic inter-main-chain hydrogen bonds. One is between the CO of residue i and the NH of residue i+3 (a β-turn); the other is between the CO of residue i+4 and the NH of residue i.

Type 2 beta bulge loops have two characteristic inter-main-chain hydrogen bonds. One is between the CO of residue i and the NH of residue i+4 (an α-turn); the other is between the CO of residue i+5 and the NH of residue i.

Beta bulge loops often have an aspartate, asparagine, serine or threonine at residue i, together with a nest (protein structural motif) at residues i+2 to i+4 (type 1) or residues i+3 to i+5 (type 2), with the side chain oxygen binding to the main chain NH groups of the nest. Site-directed mutagenesis of asx residues within a protein's β bulge loops has been described, showing that the side chain of an asx residue at various alternative positions within a β bulge loop binds to the nest and thereby helps stabilize the loop.

References

Protein structural motifs